Paula Racedo (born 21 July 1977) is an Argentine former professional tennis player.

Racedo reached a best singles ranking of 334, playing mostly on the ITF Circuit. She twice featured in the qualifying of the Brasil Open. As a doubles player, she was ranked as high as 204 in the world and won nine ITF titles.

Since retiring, she has worked as a tennis coach, which included a stint in Ecuador where she was the coach of Mell Reasco González.

ITF finals

Singles: 3 (0–3)

Doubles: 23 (9–14)

References

External links
 
 

1977 births
Living people
Argentine female tennis players
Argentine tennis coaches
20th-century Argentine women